Phraya Ratsadanupradit Mahitsaraphakdi (1857–1913, born Khaw Sim Bee was a Thai Chinese provincial administrator. He was the youngest of the six sons of Khaw Soo Cheang, a trader from Zhangzhou in China.

As a member of the Khaw family of Ranong which held the governor's post in Ranong for generations, Khaw was assigned to become governor of Trang in 1890. His most significant contribution was the introduction of the rubber tree to Thailand, which at his time was only grown in British Malaya. It has since become one of the major crops of Thailand. He also initiated the connection of Trang with Nakhon Si Thammarat and Phatthalung by road as well as the railroad connection to Nakhon Si Thammarat, one of the first railways in Thailand.

In 1902, he was assigned to become the commissioner of Monthon Phuket and held the post until his death in 1913.

A monument commemorating him was erected in the city of Trang. In 1992, he was also honored as one of the five most distinguished government officials in administration.

See also

 Kittiratt Na-Ranong, great-grand nephew and former Deputy Prime Minister of Thailand

References

1857 births
1916 deaths
Khaw na Ranong family
Members of the Privy Council of Thailand
Phraya
Thai people of Chinese descent
Chao mueang of Thailand